Philip Barth (born 10 March 1976) is a German former yacht racer who competed in the 2000 Summer Olympics.

References

External links
 
 
 

1976 births
Living people
German male sailors (sport)
Olympic sailors of Germany
Sailors at the 2000 Summer Olympics – 49er
Place of birth missing (living people)